Science in Action is a long-running weekly radio programme produced by the BBC World Service and currently hosted by British journalists Roland Pease and Marnie Chesterton, and scientist and broadcaster Professor Adam Hart. It is broadcast on Thursdays at 18.32 GMT and repeated twice the following day, at 01.32 and 08.32.

A programme with the title Science in Action is believed to have begun life in 1964, when it replaced an earlier series, dating from the 1950s, called Science and Industry. From September 1965 a short-lived series called Science in Action ran on the Home Service; it was broadcast at 19.30 on Thursdays, later 21.30. In December 1965 it was moved to 14.30 on Fridays. The present weekly World Service series, also called Science in Action, began on Saturday 7 July 1979.

See also
Inside Science, radio programme on BBC Radio Four

References

External links
 

BBC World Service programmes
Science podcasts
Science in society
1979 radio programme debuts
Science radio programmes
Science education in the United Kingdom